Édgar Hernández Marcé (born 2 February 1987) is a Spanish footballer who plays as a forward for Gimnàstic de Tarragona.

Club career
Born in Gavà, Barcelona, Catalonia, Hernández finished his youth career with local UE Cornellà, making his senior debut in the 2005–06 season in Tercera División. He first arrived in Segunda División B in the summer of 2009, signing with Alicante CF.

Hernández joined RC Celta de Vigo in June 2010, being assigned to the B team also in the third division. The following campaign he dropped down a tier by signing with CF Gavà, but returned to division three shortly after with UE Sant Andreu.

After scoring a career-best 17 goals in his first full season, in 34 appearances, Hernández joined CE Sabadell FC from Segunda División in June 2013. He made his debut as a professional on 25 August, playing the last 27 minutes in a 0–2 away defeat against SD Ponferradina.

On 29 August 2014, Hernández moved to third-tier club CF Reus Deportiu. He netted a team-best 12 times in 2015–16, helping to a first-ever promotion to the professional leagues.

Hernández returned to the third division in the 2018 off-season, with the 31-year-old agreeing to a two-year contract at former team Sabadell. He scored nine times during the 2019–20 campaign, as the Arquelinats achieved promotion to the second division.

On 8 July 2021, Herández signed a one-year deal with Primera División RFEF side Gimnàstic de Tarragona.

References

External links

1987 births
Living people
People from Gavà
Sportspeople from the Province of Barcelona
Spanish footballers
Footballers from Catalonia
Association football forwards
Segunda División players
Segunda División B players
Tercera División players
UE Cornellà players
Real Zaragoza B players
Alicante CF footballers
Celta de Vigo B players
CF Gavà players
UE Sant Andreu footballers
CE Sabadell FC footballers
CF Reus Deportiu players
Gimnàstic de Tarragona footballers